Abdelrahman Mohamed Fahmi Moustafa (born 5 April 1997) is a Qatari footballer. He currently plays for Al-Duhail.

Career statistics

International

Honours

Club
Al-Duhail
Qatar Stars League: 2016–17, 2017–18
Emir of Qatar Cup: 2016, 2018
Qatar Cup: 2018
Qatari Sheikh Jassim Cup: 2016

International
Qatar
AFC Asian Cup: 2019

References

External links
 
 
 
 

Qatari footballers
1997 births
Living people
Aspire Academy (Qatar) players
Lekhwiya SC players
Al-Duhail SC players
Al Ahli SC (Doha) players
Al-Wakrah SC players
Place of birth missing (living people)
Qatari people of Egyptian descent
Naturalised citizens of Qatar
Qatar Stars League players
Association football midfielders
2019 AFC Asian Cup players
AFC Asian Cup-winning players
Qatar international footballers